Senator Bergen may refer to:

Charles W. Berger (born 1936), Kentucky State Senate
David Berger (Wisconsin politician) (born 1946), Wisconsin State Senate
Doug Berger (fl. 1960s–2010s), North Carolina State Senate
James S. Berger (1903–1984), Pennsylvania State Senate
Philip E. Berger (born 1952), North Carolina State Senate